The Conaliini are a tribe of beetles in the family Mordellidae.

Genera
Conalia Mulsant & Rey, 1858
Conaliamorpha Ermisch, 1968
Glipodes LeConte, 1862
Isotrilophus Liljeblad, 1945
Ophthalmoconalia Ermisch, 1968
Paraconalia Ermisch, 1968
Pseudoconalia Ermisch, 1950
Stenoconalia Ermisch, 1967
Xanthoconalia Franciscolo, 1942

References

Mordellidae